Andha Yudh is a 1987 Indian action drama thriller film directed by Dayal Nihalani.

Plot
The story revolves around an evil politician a junior minister who plots the murder of the chief minister through a hired killer. After the assassination of the chief minister, the killer is pursued by an idealistic dedicated police chief. The killer takes shelter in a house where a physically challenged girl is residing. The killer takes her as hostage. The killer remembers his past and how an above average student was converted to a killer. Though the film had no songs, the background music for the film, especially for the chase sequence, was lauded by the critics.

Cast

Raj Babbar as Raja
Nana Patekar as Suhas Dandekar, Supritendent of Police
Divya Rana as Madhuri pande, Nurse
Rohini Hattangadi as Shalini
Pallavi Joshi as Saroj
Shivaji Satam as Divakar
Anant Jog as Sub Inspector Vijay Gupta
Sudhir Pandey as Sampatrao Mahadik

Awards 
34th Filmfare Awards:

Nominated

 Best Supporting Actor – Nana Patekar
 Best Supporting Actress – Pallavi Joshi

External links

 https://web.archive.org/web/20091107141743/http://v.youku.com/v_show/id_XNzM2NjYyMTY%3D.html
 http://www.rajshri.com/preview.aspx?cntid=9629

1988 films
1980s Hindi-language films
Films scored by Ajit Varman